The 2001 Melbourne Storm season was the 4th in the club's history. They competed in the NRL's 2001 Telstra Premiership and finished the regular season in 9th place. 

The 2001 season was the least successful in the Storm's history, missing the play-offs for the first time. After making a decision to move base from Olympic Park to the larger Colonial Stadium, the club seemed to lack the support, atmosphere and composure they had built up. It reflected in the team's on field performances, losing four of their first six homes games and 7 from their opening 10 overall. Amidst this time the Storm was rocked when coach Anderson quit the club after the 42-18 loss to Parramatta in Round 7.

Along with Richard Swain and Matt Orford, replacement coach Mark Murray lifted the Storm from their bad beginning. Melbourne won seven of their next ten games to reach 6th place on the ladder.

But the bad start had taken its toll, and with the 2001 finals in sight they won only two more games. A last round loss to Canberra saw the Storm finish outside the Top 8.

The 2001 season continued to mark the endurability of Kiwi Test hooker Richard Swain. He was on the field for every minute of the Storm's season and had yet to miss a game for Melbourne in the club's history.

Season Summary
 Round 1 – 15,070 fans watch the first ever rugby league game played indoors, as Melbourne go down 10-14 against Canterbury-Bankstown Bulldogs at Colonial Stadium. Referee Tim Mander, the touch judges and video referees are dropped after the round for failing to send off Storm  forward Rodney Howe for a reckless high tackle on Steve Price. Howe is suspended for six games after pleading guilty to the charge.
 Round 6 – Despite a ruling from the NRL, the Colonial Stadium roof stays open for Melbourne's game against Newcastle Knights.
 2 April – Head coach Chris Anderson quits after a poor start to the season and rumours of a falling out with club management. It had been reported that Anderson was interested in replacing outgoing Cronulla-Sutherland Sharks coach John Lang. Norths Devils coach Mark Murray is installed as caretaker coach.
 9 April – Storm owners News Limited indicate that the company was willing to sell its 50% share of the North Queensland Cowboys, but had no intention of deserting Melbourne.
 Round 9 – On Good Friday,  Matt Orford outpoints former Melbourne halfback Brett Kimmorley in the former Storm halfback's first game in Northern Eagles colours against Melbourne. Aaron Moule equals the club record with four tries in the game.
 23 April – Former head coach Chris Anderson is appointed head coach of Cronulla-Sutherland Sharks from the 2002 season.
 24 May –  Robbie Ross undergoes surgery on a chronic hamstring injury that is expected to sideline him for six weeks. In his place, Melbourne select former Australian Schoolboys rugby union halfback Paul Sheedy. 
 Round 14 – Richard Swain plays his 100th consecutive first grade game.
 Round 16 – Tasesa Lavea becomes the first Melbourne player to be an unused interchange player in club history.
 1 July – The Sunday Mail reports that the Queensland Government has confirmed that it has held talks with the Melbourne Storm about relocating to Brisbane and basing itself at Lang Park.
 Round 18 – Melbourne celebrate their 100th game of premiership football with a record-breaking 64-0 win over Wests Tigers at Colonial Stadium. The 64 points is Melbourne's greatest winning margin, it was the first time holding the opposition to nil; while Matt Orford sets a new club record with 10 goals in the game. Richard Swain becomes the first player to have played in 100 games for the club, featuring in every game played since 1998.
 12 July – Penrith Panthers sign Storm forward Ben Roarty on a two-year contract from the 2002 NRL season.
 Round 20 – Conceding a new club record of 54 points, Melbourne are thrashed by premiership fancy Parramatta Eels 10-54, with Jason Taylor equaling the Australian rugby league points scoring record of Daryl Halligan.
 Round 21 – The retractable seats at Colonial Stadium are brought in for the first time for a Storm game. It is rumoured that the costs to bring the seats in and replace damaged turf is in excess of $1m. Marcus Bai scores his 50th try for the club, the first player to reach that milestone.
 Round 24 – Melbourne maintain slim hopes of a place in the top eight with a narrow 28-24 victory over last-placed Penrith in a Monday night match at Colonial Stadium.
 Round 25 – A controversial 24-all draw with New Zealand Warriors seals the top eight door shut for Melbourne, meaning the club will miss the NRL finals for the first time. Referee Tim Mander is admonished for directing Matt Geyer to take a conversion kick two metres closer to the sideline than from where the Storm's final try was scored.
 Round 26 – Richard Swain becomes the first player to make 1000 tackles in a season. Swain also completes the marathon achievement of being the only forward to have played every minute of every game throughout the season.
 20 November – Melbourne turn their back on Colonial Stadium, making the move back to Olympic Park for the 2002 season.

Milestone games

Jerseys

Melbourne's jerseys were again manufactured by Fila and carried the same design as the 1999-2000 home jersey. A new purple away jersey design with white and silver thunderbolts was worn in select games, with navy shorts and purple socks. For the first time, the jerseys displayed a front sponsor, with a white Adecco logo in a red box on the home jersey, with just the white logo on the purple away jersey.

Fixtures

Pre Season

Regular season

Source:

Ladder

2001 Coaching Staff
Head coach: Chris Anderson until 2 April 2001
Head coach: Mark Murray from 2 April 2001
Assistant coach: Anthony Griffin
Football Manager: Greg Brentnall
Physiotherapist: Greg Gibson 
Head Trainer: Steve Litvensky
Strength and conditioning Coach: Aaron Salisbury

2001 Squad
List current as of 10 August 2021

Player movements

Losses
 Kevin Carmichael to Norths Devils
 Chris Essex to Released
 Wayne Evans to Northern Eagles
 Wade Fenton to Released
 Brett Kimmorley to Northern Eagles
 John Lomax to Retirement
 Paul Marquet to Newcastle Knights
 Tony Martin to London Broncos

Gains
 Junior Langi from St George Illawarra Dragons
 Matt Orford from Northern Eagles
 Henry Perenara from Auckland Warriors
 Paul Whatuira from Auckland Warriors

Team of the Century
In conjunction with the celebrations for Melbourne's 100th game in round 18 against Wests, Melbourne ran a "team of the century" promotion to honour the best 17 players over the first 100 games of the club's existence. The team was announced during half time of the round 21 game against Brisbane.

Representative honours
This table lists all players who have played a representative match in 2001.

Statistics
This table contains playing statistics for all Melbourne Storm players to have played in the 2001 NRL season. 

Statistics sources:

Scorers

Most points in a game: 24 points
 Round 18 - Matt Orford (1 try, 10 Goals) vs Wests Tigers

Most tries in a game: 4 
 Round 9 - Aaron Moule vs Northern Eagles

Winning games

Highest score in a winning game: 64 points 
 Round 18 vs Wests Tigers

Lowest score in a winning game: 20 points
 Round 3 vs St George Illawarra Dragons

Greatest winning margin: 64 points 
 Round 18 vs Wests Tigers

Greatest number of games won consecutively: 3
 Round 11 - Round 13

Losing games

Highest score in a losing game: 28 points
 Round 2 vs North Queensland Cowboys
 Round 6 vs Newcastle Knights
 Round 23 vs Sydney Roosters

Lowest score in a losing game: 6 points 
 Round 26 vs Canberra Raiders

Greatest losing margin: 44 points
 Round 20 vs Parramatta Eels

Greatest number of games lost consecutively: 4 
 Round 5 - Round 8

Feeder Team
Melbourne Storm reserve players again travelled to Brisbane each week to play with Queensland Cup team Norths Devils. Making the finals for the fourth straight season, Norths Devils finished fourth, but were eliminated in the first week of the 2001 Queensland Cup finals.

Awards and honours

Melbourne Storm Awards Night
Melbourne Storm Player of the Year: Richard Swain
Melbourne Storm Rookie of the Year: Steven Bell  
Melbourne Storm Clubman of the Year: Stephen Kearney  
Mick Moore Chairman's Award: Richard Swain

Other Awards
The Weakest Link Sports Special Winner; Rodney Howe.

Notes

References

Melbourne Storm seasons
Melbourne Storm season